The women's pole vault event at the 2007 World Championships in Athletics took place on August 26, 2007 (qualification) and August 28, 2007 (final) at the Nagai Stadium in Osaka, Japan.

Medallists

Records

Results

Final

Qualification

Group A

Group B

References
Official results, qualification - IAAF.org
Official results, final - IAAF.org

Pole vault
Pole vault at the World Athletics Championships
2007 in women's athletics